Pohjolan Voima Oy (PVO; English: Northern Power Company Ltd.) is the second biggest Finnish energy company, which owns hydropower and thermal power plants (including biofuel-fired power plants).

Shareholders
Pohjolan Voima is a founder and main shareholder of the Olkiluoto Nuclear Power Plant operator Teollisuuden Voima Oy. 

Major shareholders of Pohjolan Voima are Finnish pulp and paper manufacturers UPM Oyj (47,7%) and Stora Enso Oyj (15,6%). Other shareholders include power and utility companies owned by several municipalities. The energy produced by the company is distributed among its shareholders based on their ownership and the shareholders pay for the actual production costs (so called Mankala principle). This arrangement allows for smaller power companies to participate in larger power station projects together and to benefit from the economics of scale.

Carbon intensity

Transmission grid 
PVO sold its share of the Fingrid national electricity transmission grid operator with €247.4 million in April 2011. Income was delivered total to the owners in 2012. Biggest shares were UPM/Myllykoski €109 million and Stora Enso ca €37 million.

See also

 Energy in Finland

References 

Companies based in Helsinki
Electric power companies of Finland
Energy companies established in 1943
1943 establishments in Finland